Given to Fly is the debut studio album by Swedish pop singer Ola. It was released in Sweden in June 2006 and debuted at number one on the Swedish Albums Chart.

Track listing

"Rain" (3:47)
"Cops Come Knocking" (3:42)
"How We Do It" (3:53)
"Given to Fly" (4:03)
"Till the End" (3:21)
"Everything I Am" (4:10)
"Invincible" (3:30)
"My Home" (3:23)
"I Could Be Him" (3:31)
"Time to Let You Go" (3:43)
"Brothers" (3:47)
"Go Go Sweden" (3:32)

Charts

References

Ola Svensson albums
2006 debut albums